Bucculatrix phagnalella is a moth of the family Bucculatricidae. It is found in mainland Spain and on Mallorca, Rhodes and the Canary Islands. It was described in 1908 by Thomas de Grey, 6th Baron Walsingham.

The wingspan is 7–8 mm. The forewings are whitish, thickly sprinkled with fuscous and fawn-brown scaling. The hindwings are shining pale grey.

The larvae feed on Phagnalon saxatile. They mine the leaves of their host plant. The young larvae create a corridor with a broad central frass line. Older larvae live freely, creating fleck mines along the leaf margin.  The larvae can be found from November to December.

References

Moths described in 1908
Bucculatricidae
Moths of Europe
Taxa named by Thomas de Grey, 6th Baron Walsingham